Ronald "Ron" Joseph Tesolin (February 3, 1940 – November 13, 1986) was a provincial level politician from Alberta, Canada. He served as a member of the Legislative Assembly of Alberta from 1975 to 1979 sitting with the governing Progressive Conservative caucus.

Political career
Tesolin ran for a seat to the Alberta Legislature in the 1975 Alberta general election. He won the electoral district of Lac La Biche-McMurray defeating four other candidates by a comfortable margin to pick up the district for the governing Progressive Conservative party. He retired from provincial politics at dissolution of the legislature in 1979.

References

External links
Legislative Assembly of Alberta Members Listing

1940 births
1986 deaths
Progressive Conservative Association of Alberta MLAs